Anticrates metreta is a moth of the Lacturidae family. It is known from Queensland, Australia. Anticrates metreta's wingspan is around 2cms.

References

Zygaenoidea